Anne Delvaux (born 20 October 1970 in Liège) is a Belgian politician and a member of the cdH. She was elected as a member of the Belgian Senate in 2007.

Notes

1970 births
Living people
Centre démocrate humaniste politicians
Members of the Belgian Federal Parliament
Centre démocrate humaniste MEPs
MEPs for Belgium 2009–2014
21st-century women MEPs for Belgium